Isaiah Hartenstein (born May 5, 1998) is a German-American professional basketball player for the New York Knicks of the National Basketball Association (NBA).

Early life
Born in Eugene, Oregon, Hartenstein is the son of Florian, a German basketball coach and former professional basketball player of Afro-German descent. His mother is American. His parents met in the United States when his father attended the University of Oregon.

In 2008, Hartenstein and his family moved to Germany, where his father was playing professionally.

Professional career

Artland Dragons (2015–2016)
Hartenstein joined the MTV Gießen youth ranks and continued his career at the youth teams of QTSV Quakenbrück/Artland Dragons, after his father had signed to play with the Artland Dragons in 2009.

In the 2013–14 season, Hartenstein led the Artland Dragons' junior team to a German championship in the Under-16 Bundesliga JBBL, while being named Most Valuable Player. He averaged 20.9 points, 12.1 rebounds, 3.4 assists, 2.9 steals and 1.9 blocks on the season. His father Florian who served as head coach of the team was named JBBL Coach of the Year.

Hartenstein was selected to play in the 2014 Jordan Brand Classic International Game: He finished the game with four points and five rebounds in 18 minutes.

Hartenstein helped the Žalgiris Kaunas Under-18 squad to win the qualifying tournament to the Euroleague Basketball Next Generation Tournament and was selected MVP.

On February 1, 2015, Hartenstein made his debut in Germany's top-tier level Basketball Bundesliga, seeing 1:12 minutes of action against Eisbären Bremerhaven.

Žalgiris Kaunas (2016–2017)
In August 2015, Hartenstein signed a deal with Lithuanian powerhouse Žalgiris Kaunas, but he remained with the Artland Dragons on loan. The Dragons had withdrawn from the Bundesliga, and were relegated to the 2. Bundesliga ProB, Germany's third division. Hartenstein played in 14 games for the Quakenbrück based side during the 2015–16 campaign, compiling averages of 11.6 points, 8.9 rebounds, 2.1 blocks, 1.6 steals and 1.4 assists.

In January 2016, Hartenstein decided to leave the Artland Dragons to join Žalgiris Kaunas.

Hartenstein made his debut for Žalgiris in Lithuania's top-flight league, the LKL, on September 28, 2016 against Šiauliai and in the EuroLeague against Fenerbahce on October 26. Later in that season, he helped Žalgiris win their first ever King Mindaugas Cup.

Houston Rockets (2018–2020)
In February 2016, Hartenstein attended the "Basketball Without Borders Global Camp" during the NBA All-Star Weekend in Toronto, Canada. On April 7, 2017, he scored 10 points and grabbed three rebounds in 19 minutes of play at the Nike Hoop Summit.

Hartenstein declared for the 2017 NBA draft on April 22, 2017. He was also named an invite for the 2017 NBA Draft Combine, but he ultimately declined participation for the event. On June 22, 2017, he was selected with the 43rd overall pick in the 2017 NBA draft by the Houston Rockets and subsequently competed for the team in the 2017 NBA Summer League.

In the 2017–18 campaign, Hartenstein appeared in 38 games of the NBA G League, averaging 9.5 points and 6.6 rebounds a contest for the Rio Grande Valley Vipers. 

On July 25, 2018, the Houston Rockets signed Hartenstein. After being sent down to the Rio Grande Valley Vipers, he was suspended one game without pay after leaving the bench during an altercation in a 132–109 loss to the Memphis Hustle on December 17, 2019.

On February 7, 2019, Hartenstein recorded his first career triple-double after posting 12 points, 16 rebounds and 11 assists in a 103–102 road win against Salt Lake City Stars. In the 2018–19 season, Hartenstein scored 33 points and made a career-high 8 3-pointers in the series-clinching game as they won the NBA G League championship with the Rio Grande Valley Vipers. He won the NBA G League Finals MVP award.

On June 23, 2020, the Houston Rockets announced that they had waived Hartenstein.

Denver Nuggets (2020–2021)
On November 30, 2020, the Denver Nuggets announced that they had signed Hartenstein to a multi–year contract. Playing behind the All-Star center Nikola Jokic, Hartenstein averaged 9 minutes, 3.5 points and 2.8 rebounds per game.

Cleveland Cavaliers (2021)
On March 25, 2021, Hartenstein and two future second-round picks were traded to the Cleveland Cavaliers in exchange for center JaVale McGee. In his first twelve games with the Cavs, Hartenstein averaged 19 minutes of playing time and 9 points, 7 rebounds, 2.6 assists and 1.4 blocks per game.

Los Angeles Clippers (2021–2022)
On September 27, 2021, Hartenstein signed with the Los Angeles Clippers.

New York Knicks (2022–present)
On July 12, 2022, Hartenstein signed a two-year, $16 million contract with the New York Knicks.

National team career
Hartenstein represented Germany at the 2014 FIBA Europe Under-16 Championship and the 2015 FIBA Europe Under-18 Championship. He also helped carry Germany to a fourth-place finish at the 2016 FIBA Europe Under-18 Championship, averaging team-highs of 14.7 points, 9.5 rebounds, 1.7 blocks, and 1.7 steals a contest, which earned him a spot in the tournament's "All-Star Five".

In August 2017, he made his debut with the German men's national team and took part in EuroBasket 2017, averaging 4.3 points and 2.5 rebounds per game.

Career statistics

NBA

Regular season

|-
| style="text-align:left;"|
| style="text-align:left;"|Houston 
| 28 || 0 || 7.9 || .488 || .333 || .786 || 1.7 || .5 || .3 || .4 || 1.9
|-
| style="text-align:left;"|
| style="text-align:left;"|Houston 
| 23 || 2 || 11.6 || .657 || .000 || .679 || 3.9 || .8 || .4 || .5 || 4.7
|-
| style="text-align:left;"|
| style="text-align:left;"|Denver
| 30 || 0 || 9.1 || .513 ||  || .611 || 2.8 || .5 || .4 || .7 || 3.5
|-
| style="text-align:left;"|
| style="text-align:left;"|Cleveland
| 16 || 2 || 17.9 || .582 || .333 || .686 || 6.0 || 2.5 || .5 || 1.2 || 8.3
|-
| style="text-align:left;"|
| style="text-align:left;"|L.A. Clippers 
| 68 || 0 || 17.9 || .626 || .467 || .689 || 4.9 || 2.4 || .7 || 1.1 || 8.3
|- class="sortbottom"
| style="text-align:center;" colspan="2"|Career
| 165 || 4 || 13.7 || .600 || .383 || .682 || 3.9 || 1.5 || .5 || .8 || 5.8

Playoffs

|-
| style="text-align:left;"|2019
| style="text-align:left;"|Houston 
| 2 || 0 || 1.0 || 1.000 ||  ||  || .5 || .0 || .0 || .0 || 2.0
|- class="sortbottom"
| style="text-align:center;" colspan="2"|Career
| 2 || 0 || 1.0 || 1.000 || .000 || .000 || .5 || .0 || .0 || .0 || 2.0

Europe

|-
| style="text-align:left;"|2015–16
| style="text-align:left;"|Artland Dragons 
| ProB
| 14 || 24.0 || .479 || .425 || .543 || 8.9 || 1.4 || 1.6 || 2.1 || 11.6
|-
| style="text-align:left;"|2016–17
| style="text-align:left;"|Žalgiris 
| LKL
| 29 || 12.2 || .490 || .286 || .705 || 3.5 || .7 || .9 || .6 || 4.7
|- class="sortbottom"
| style="text-align:center;" colspan="3"|Career
| 43 || 18.1 || .485 || .356 || .624 || 6.2 || 1.1 || 1.3 || 1.4 || 8.2

References

External links

 NBA G League bio

1998 births
Living people
American expatriate basketball people in Lithuania
American men's basketball players
Artland Dragons players
Basketball players from Oregon
BC Žalgiris players
Centers (basketball)
Cleveland Cavaliers players
Denver Nuggets players
German expatriate basketball people in Lithuania
German expatriate basketball people in the United States
German men's basketball players
German people of African-American descent
German people of American descent
American people of German descent
Houston Rockets draft picks
Houston Rockets players
Los Angeles Clippers players
National Basketball Association players from Germany
New York Knicks players
Power forwards (basketball)
Rio Grande Valley Vipers players
Sportspeople from Eugene, Oregon